Roswitha Esser (born 18 January 1941 in Bad Godesberg) is a West German sprint canoeist who competed from the mid-1960s to the early 1970s. Competing in three Summer Olympics, she won two gold medals in the K-2 500 m event (1964, 1968).

Esser also won seven medals at the ICF Canoe Sprint World Championships with two golds (K-2 500 m: 1963, 1970), four silvers (K-1 500 m: 1966, K-4 500 m: 1963, 1966, 1971), and a bronze (K-4 500 m: 1970).

References

External links

1941 births
Canoeists at the 1964 Summer Olympics
Canoeists at the 1968 Summer Olympics
Canoeists at the 1972 Summer Olympics
West German female canoeists
Living people
Olympic canoeists of the United Team of Germany
Olympic canoeists of West Germany
Olympic gold medalists for the United Team of Germany
Olympic gold medalists for West Germany
Olympic medalists in canoeing
ICF Canoe Sprint World Championships medalists in kayak
Medalists at the 1968 Summer Olympics
Medalists at the 1964 Summer Olympics